Sailor's Song (French:Le chant du marin) is a 1932 French comedy film directed by Carmine Gallone and starring Albert Préjean, Jim Gérald and Lolita Benavente.

The film's sets were designed by the art director Serge Piménoff.

Cast
 Albert Préjean as Georget  
 Jim Gérald as Marius  
 Lolita Benavente as Carmen  
 Sylvette Fillacier as Catherine  
 Marthe Mussine as Marie  
 Robert Cuperly as Le matelot  
 Oreste Bilancia as Le cuisinier  
 Doumbia as L'homme de couleur  
 Ginette Gaubert as Maxe  
 Franz Maldacea as Zizi  
 Pedro Elviro as Jeff 
 Louis Zellas as Gaspard  
 Gasquet as Le capitaine  
 Rene Rufly as L'officier 
 Willy Castello 
 Jesús Castro Blanco 
 Fernandel

References

Bibliography 
 Crisp, Colin. Genre, Myth and Convention in the French Cinema, 1929-1939. Indiana University Press, 2002.

External links 
 

1932 films
1932 comedy films
French comedy films
1930s French-language films
Films directed by Carmine Gallone
French black-and-white films
1930s French films